Erechthias pachygramma is a moth of the family Tineidae first described by Edward Meyrick in 1921. It is found in Sri Lanka.

References

Moths of Asia
Moths described in 1921
Erechthiinae